The Raycraft Ranch killifish or Raycraft poolfish (Empetrichthys latos concavus) is a subspecies of the killifish Empetrichthys latos, was first described in 1948. This subspecies was restricteded to a single spring on the Raycraft Ranch in the Pahrump Valley of Nye County, Nevada it became extinct as a result of groundwater extraction and the filling in of the spring.

References 

 http://www.thefederalregister.com/d.p/2004-04-02-04-7412
 

Raycraft Ranch killifish
Extinct animals of the United States
Fish described in 1948
Fish of North America becoming extinct since 1500